Sakima may refer to:

Allowat Sakima, the chief portrayed in the induction ceremonies of the Order of the Arrow
 Sakima, the Japanese saboteur who fights the actor David Bacon in the movie series The Masked Marvel
Sakima, English singer
Société Aurifère du Kivu et du Maniema, a mining company in the eastern Democratic Republic of the Congo.